Bangalaia thomensis is a species of beetle in the family Cerambycidae. It was described by Stephan von Breuning in 1947. It is known from São Tomé and Cameroon.

References

Prosopocerini
Insects of Cameroon
Beetles of Africa
Beetles described in 1947